Cham-e Heydar (also Romanized as Cham-e Ḩeydar; also known as Qal‘eh-ye Cham-e Ḩeyda) is a village in Afrineh Rural District, Mamulan District, Pol-e Dokhtar County, Lorestan Province, Iran. At the 2006 census, its population was 75, in 16 families.

References 

Towns and villages in Pol-e Dokhtar County